Storm Lake is a city in and the county seat of Buena Vista County, Iowa, United States. The population was 11,269 in the 2020 census, an increase from 10,076 in the 2000 census. Located along the northern shore of the Storm Lake reservoir, the city is home to Buena Vista University, King's Pointe Waterpark Resort, the Living Heritage Tree Museum, and the Santa's Castle holiday attraction. It is the principal city of the Storm Lake micropolitan area.

History 
Storm Lake was incorporated in 1873. The city of Storm Lake was named from the lake where it is said a trapper experienced a severe storm. A more romantic legend claims the lake took its name after two star-crossed lovers from opposed Native American bands paddled out for a secret rendezvous, only to be drowned as a sudden storm blew in.

As of the 2020 census, Storm Lake was the most ethnically diverse city in Iowa, with over 60% of the population self identifying as non-white.  Additionally, 86.5% of students enrolled in the public school district are non-Caucasian.  Storm Lake's diversity is the result of many factors, including refugee resettlement programs and an abundance of meat packing jobs drawing migrant workers to the town.

Geography
Storm Lake is located in the northwestern part of the state, along its namesake Storm Lake. Much of the lakefront is open to the public in parks and preserves.

Climate

Demographics

2020 census
As of the 2022 U.S. Census, Storm Lake's population was estimated at 11,269, up from 10,600 for the 2010 Census and 10,078 in 2000. Citing steady growth and other sources, city officials suggest that an accurate population count would be 13,000 or more. The community is considered one of the state's most ethnically diverse. The community celebrates its populations from around the world in a Parade of Nations each July 4 and public art installations.

The median home valuation is $142,000, median rent is $695 per month. Median household income is estimated at just under $49,000. The community has an estimated 250 businesses.

Economy
Tyson Foods operates a large hog slaughterhouse, meat packing plant, and turkey processing plant in the city.

Arts and culture

 Living Heritage Tree Museum is located on the shore of Storm Lake, and contains a library and the Witter Art Gallery
 Santa's Castle is a seasonal display of antique holiday animation, housed in a former Victorian library.
 The Buena Vista County Historical Society operates a museum.
 King's Pointe is a 100-room community-owned tourism resort located on the lakefront, with waterparks, banquet facilities and a restaurant.
 A concert bandshell is located in Sunset Park.

Parks and recreation
The city operates Sunrise Pointe, a 9-hole golf course. The city has are five beach areas, and a recreation trail linking them.

Education

The Storm Lake Community School District operates five local public schools, including a high school, a middle school, and an elementary school.  As of the 2020-21 school year, the Storm Lake Community School District served 2,841 students.

St. Mary's Catholic Church operates a private K-12 school system, St. Mary's High School.

Buena Vista University is located in Storm Lake. As of 2022, the university has 1,982 students on a  campus within Storm Lake. The city hosts a satellite campus for Iowa Central Community College, including an industrial training center established in 2021.

Media
The community has a twice-weekly newspaper, the Storm Lake Times Pilot, which merged with the Pilot-Tribune in 2022. KAYL/KKIA radio serves the community, as well as a university radio station, KBVU. A Spanish-language newspaper also covers the area.

Infrastructure

Emergency services
The Storm Lake Police Department provides law enforcement services to the city. The department employs 21 sworn officers, and two community services officers.

Health care 
Storm Lake is served by Buena Vista Regional Medical Center, a 54-bed critical access hospital, and United Community Health Center.

Notable people  

 Nate Bjorkgren, basketball coach
 Skip Carnine (born 1941), retired educator and Storm Lake native; Republican member of the Arkansas House of Representatives from Rogers
 Art Cullen, editor of the Storm Lake Times, won the 2017 Pulitzer Prize for editorial writing.
 Janet Dailey, romance novelist
 Joe Decker (1947–2003), MLB player
 George B. French, actor
 Edmund B. Gregory, Lieutenant General in the U.S. Army
 Julie Gutz (born 1926), All-American Girls Professional Baseball League player
 Gene Hackman, Oscar-winning actor resided here in 1945; reference Storm Lake "Breeze" yearbook 1945, 10th grade
 Winton Hoch, Oscar-winning cinematographer
 Marjorie Holmes (1910–2002), author of hundreds of magazine articles and several novels, most notably Two From Galilee
 Frederic O. MacCartney (1864-1903), Massachusetts socialist politician, graduate of Storm Lake High School
 Reno H. Sales (1876–1969), Chief Geologist of Anaconda Corporation, "father of mining geology"

References

External links
 

 
Cities in Buena Vista County, Iowa
Cities in Iowa
Micropolitan areas of Iowa
County seats in Iowa
Populated places established in 1873